Toffia is a  (municipality) in the Province of Rieti in the Italian region of Latium, located about  northeast of Rome and about  southwest of Rieti.

Toffia borders the following municipalities: Castelnuovo di Farfa, Fara in Sabina, Nerola, Poggio Nativo.

The church of Santa Maria Nova stands on the hill above the town.

References

External links
 Official website

Cities and towns in Lazio